Actinoplanes nipponensis is a Gram-positive and antibiotic-producing bacterium from the genus Actinoplanes which has been isolated from soil from Japan.

References 

Micromonosporaceae
Bacteria described in 2014